The men's 79 kg (173.8 lbs) Light-Contact category at the W.A.K.O. World Championships 2007 in Belgrade was the fifth heaviest of the male Light-Contact tournaments falling between middleweight and light heavyweight when compared to Low-Kick and K-1's weight classes.  There were twenty-three men from three continents (Europe, Asia and Africa) taking part in the competition.  Each of the matches was three rounds of two minutes each and were fought under Light-Contact rules. 

Owing to the unequal number of fighters not suitable for a thirty-two man tournament, nine of the contestants had byes through to the second round.  The tournament gold medalist was the Hungarian Zoltan Dancso who won gold by defeating the German Stefan Bücker by split decision.  By virtue of reaching the semi finals, Slovak Martin Navratil and Poland's Robert Matyja won bronze medals.

Results

Key

See also
List of WAKO Amateur World Championships
List of WAKO Amateur European Championships
List of male kickboxers

References

External links
 WAKO World Association of Kickboxing Organizations Official Site

Kickboxing events at the WAKO World Championships 2007 Belgrade
2007 in kickboxing
Kickboxing in Serbia